Billy Papke (born William Papke, and known as "The Illinois Thunderbolt") (September 17, 1886 – November 26, 1936) was an American boxer who held the World Middleweight Championship from September 7 to November 26, 1908.  In 1910-12, he also took the Australian and British versions of the World Middleweight Championship, though American boxing historians generally take less note of these titles.   With a solid and efficient punch, 70 percent of his better publicized career wins by decision were from knockouts, and roughly 40% of his reported fights were as well. Papke was inducted into the International Boxing Hall of Fame in 2001.  Sportswriter Nat Fleischer, original owner of "Ring" Magazine, ranked Papke as the seventh best middleweight of all time. Announcer Charley Rose ranked him as the tenth greatest middleweight in boxing history. He was elected to the Ring Boxing Hall of Fame in 1972.

Early life and career
Papke was born on September 17, 1886 in Spring Valley, Illinois.  He began his boxing career in 1906, eventually winning 40 fights by decision and drawing six times.  He worked as a miner during his years in Illinois and occasionally boxed with fellow miners.   His earliest fights in 1906 took place near Spring Valley or Peoria where he had moved by 1907, though he traveled frequently North to box in the next few years.

In an important early bout on September 14, 1907, Papke knocked out Terry Martin in the third round at the National Athletic Club in Philadelphia.  The win led several reporters to view Papke as a middleweight title contender.

On November 22, 1907, Papke defeated Bartley Connolly in a fourth round technical knockout.  In a one sided bout, Papke floored his opponent once in the first and five times in the third.  Connolly tried to clinch in the early rounds to avoid his aggressive and better skilled opponent.  In his career, Connolly would defeat the great Joe Walcott, and box in Great Britain.

In a well publicized bout On November 14, 1907, Papke defeated Tony Caponi in their first bout in a second round knockout at the Peoria Club in Peoria, Illinois.  After only two minutes and ten seconds of fighting in the second, Papke put Caponi down for the count with a strong right uppercut to the jaw immediately after breaking from a clinch. Caponi tried to rise, but went back down and stayed on the mat.  The two had fought two draws the previous May and June, with Papke holding a slight lead during the more recent match.  Adding to the interest in the contest was Caponi's unsuccessful attempt at Hugo Kelly's World and American 158 lb. middleweight championship the previous August.

American middleweight championship bout with Hugo Kelly, March, 1908
On March 16, 1908, Papke defeated Hugo Kelly at the Hippodrome in Milwaukee in a ten round points decision that was billed as the world and American 158 pound middleweight championship, though it was not a universally sanctioned bout.  There was a significant amount of clinching, and some butting in the match mostly attributed to Papke.  Papke put Kelly on the mat in the first round with a blow to the jaw, but Kelly recovered quickly and fought well defensively.  There was a shower of blows in the fourth, followed by more clinching in the fifth, as the boxers recovered from fatigue. The final four rounds were close, but the referee decided in favor of Papke at the bell in the tenth.  Papke's management successfully used the win as a stepping stone to a world middleweight title match with Stanley Ketchel ten weeks later.  On May 15, 1909, Papke would defeat Kelly more decisively in a first round knockout in Colma, California.

Rivalry with middleweight champion Stanley Ketchel
Papke's first meeting with Stanley Ketchel resulted in loss by 10-round points decision, on June 4, 1908 in Milwaukee, Wisconsin. It was the first of Papke's four fights with the reigning Middleweight champion.

World middleweight championship win, September, 1908

Papke won the second fight with Ketchel in an upset at Jeffrie's Arena in Vernon, near Los Angeles, on September 7, 1908 in a convincing twelve round technical knockout, and impressively took the world middleweight title from the reigning champion. The referee was the thirty-three year old boxing legend and former heavyweight champion James J. Jeffries.

According to legend, Papke helped his chances of winning the fight by punching Ketchel in the face or throat unexpectedly when Ketchel stepped forward with his right hand extended to shake at the beginning of the bout.  This legend has been dis-proven by boxing historians, as neither the combatants, nor ringside newspaper reporters, corner men, or other eyewitnesses ever attested to or made record of the incident.  A few newspapers including the Record Argus of Greenville, Pennsylvania, perpetuated the legend of the sucker punch at the handshake, though the myth may have had its origin in Papke's furious attack very early in the first round and the not infrequent habit of a few boxing reporters of the era to embellish their reporting.  Even reporting on his death in 1936, a newspaper perpetuated the myth of Papke's first blow coming as Ketchel extended his hand to shake.

A California newspaper, likely using the account of a ringside reporter, inferred the fighting did not commence until after the opening bell, and that both men entered the ring in perfect condition, but that within one minute and twenty seconds, Papke had mounted an attack that determined the outcome of the bout.    Ketchel was down three times in the first round, and Papke seemed to have the upper hand throughout the fierce and furious bout.  The match became so one-sided in favor of Papke by the close, that the crowd yelled for referee Jeffries to stop the fight.  Papke dealt the final blows in the twelfth delivering a right swing followed by a powerful hook.

Loss of world middleweight championship, November, 1908

In their third meeting, two months later on November 26, 1908, Papke lost his title to Ketchel in an eleventh round knockout in Colma, California, and received a terrific beating in the process. Papke's own wife did not recognize him after the bout was over. Ketchel led the bout through most of the first ten rounds. Papke went down in the eleventh for a count of nine, and not long after arising was struck by a left to the chin that ended the bout.

Papke lost the fourth and final meeting by unanimous decision before a large crowd in Colma, California, near San Francisco, on July 5, 1909. It was a particularly savage encounter and lasted 20 rounds.  One source wrote that of all their fights it was "the bloodiest and most grueling".  Ketchel was reported to have broken his right hand in the sixth, and Papke a bone in his left.

Impressive wins over welterweight contender Willie Lewis, 1909-10
On October 8, 1909, and March 19, 1910, Papke impressively defeated American welterweight contender Willie Lewis in Pittsburgh in a six round newspaper decision, and in France's Cirque de Paris in a third round knockout.  In their well attended Pittsburgh match, Lewis was down for a nine count as early as the second from a right to the jaw and continued receiving blows to the jaw in the third.  Lewis came back only briefly in the fifth, and with a broken nose hung on barely til the closing bell in the sixth. In their heavily attended world welterweight championship bout in Paris, Papke demonstrated superior hitting ability, speed, and defense throughout the match, and was the aggressor through all three rounds.  Papke tried to have his agent arrange a match with Ketchel after the bout, but it was never to be.

Mid career
After Ketchel's murder at age 24, on October 15, 1910, while training at a Cattle Ranch in Conway, Missouri, Papke became one of several middleweights contesting the world middleweight title.

Four important bouts at Sydney Stadium
On February 11, 1911, Papke lost to Cyclone Johnny Thompson in Sydney, Australia in a twenty round points decision, with Thompson subsequently claiming Papke's world middleweight title.  The bout was one of four well-attended bouts he fought for the Australian version of the Middleweight Championship at Sydney Stadium, which included a win against Ed Williams as well as a win by TKO and a loss by DQ to Dave Smith.  In Papke's TKO victory against Smith, Smith led through six rounds, but went down three times before his seconds threw in the towel. Smith would later take the Australian Light Heavyweight and Heavyweight Championships, as well as compete for the Australian Middleweight Championship.

On August 22, 1911, Papke had a surprising loss to Sailor Burke, at St. Nicholas Arena in New York City in a newspaper decision of the New York Times.  Papke was defending his World Middleweight title which he took at London's Palladium in a ninth round knockout from Jim Sullivan two months earlier on June 8, 1911. Burke battered Papke, but used little science in his approach. Attending the fight, and likely disappointed, was the Scottish reporter Percy Douglas, 10th Marquess of Queensberry, a member of the royal line and son of the 9th Marquess, who had endorsed the modern boxing rules published by Welshman John Graham Chambers in 1867.  The title did not pass hands as both men were over the middleweight weight limit of 160, and weighing nearer 165.

After an October, 1911 loss in Boston to Bob Moha, he briefly retired, but he would soon return to the ring.

Loss to Frank Mantel, middleweight contender, February, 1912
On February 22, 1912, Papke lost to American world middleweight contender Frank Mantell in Sacramento in a twenty round points decision.  It was a slow bout with much vertical wrestling while the contestants weakly attempted to score blows during the clinches.  After the bout, Mantell tried to claim Papke's former British world middleweight title of June 11, 1911 taken from Jim Sullivan in London. Mantell's claim was weak, however, as Papke claimed he did not make weight for the match.

Win over Marcel Moreau in Paris, June, 1912
On June 29, 1912, Papke, defending his June, 1911 world middleweight title, defeated Marcel Moreau at France's Cirque de Paris in a sixteenth round technical knockout. 
Papke was down in the first, while Moreau was knocked down twice in the fifteenth by left and right hooks before failing to show for the final round.

Papke lost to middle and welterweight contender Leo Houck in the third week of September 1912 at the Olympia Athletic Club in Philadelphia in a six round newspaper decision.  The first two rounds were slow, with Papke staging a comeback in the third which was marred by his tossing Houck around in the clinches and refusing to break at the referee's request.  His clinching may have signaled his fatigue from the repeated blows of his opponent.  In the final three rounds, Houck dominated, throwing several swift blows with no return in the fourth, and sending Papke through the ropes in the sixth.

Win over European middleweight champion Georges Carpentier, October 1912
Papke traveled to Paris where he beat future champion Georges Carpentier in an eighteenth round technical knockout on October 23, 1912.  It became a non-championship fight when Papke exceeded the middle-weight limit at the pre-fight weigh-in. Papke's infighting or close range techniques baffled the skilled Carpentier.  At the end of the eighth, Carpentier's right eye was closed, and he fought more cautiously.  Though staging a comeback in the fifteenth and sixteenth, Carpentier was floored in the opening of the seventeenth round, when Papke struck him with a left hook, likely taking advantage of the reduced vision on his opponent's right side.  Carpentier attempted to fight on but gave up after consulting with his corner men, and did not return for the eighteenth round.

Final loss of the world middleweight championship to Frank Klaus, March 1913

Papke was beaten by an American, Pennsylvania middleweight Frank Klaus on March 5, 1913 at France's Cirque de Paris.  The referee warned Papke and called fouls and breaks repeatedly in the late rounds for wrestling, head-butting, and low blows.  In frustration, the referee called his last foul in the fifteenth round for a low blow which Papke had been called on in the previous two rounds, disqualifying Papke and ending both the match and Papke's title hopes.

After his October 14, 1913, loss to Marty Rowan in St. Louis, Papke took a three year hiatus from the ring, before returning in 1916, and facing his last few opponents.

He continued fighting until 1919, losing a four rounder to the prolific boxer and contender Soldier Bartfield in San Francisco in April 1919.

Boxing retirement, death and legacy
On November 22, 1932, Papke came out of his 1919 boxing retirement to stage a three round exhibition with heavyweight "Fireman" Jim Flynn, the only boxer who ever knocked out Jack Dempsey.  He had lost to Flynn earlier in a newspaper decision in March 1909 in Pasadena.

Appearances in boxing movies
In his retirement near Los Angeles, he benefited from his real estate investments.  He appeared in at least three boxing-themed movies;  The Prince of Broadway (1926) which featured boxers Leach Cross, Frankie Genaro, and Ad Wolgast, Madison Square Garden (1932), where he appeared as himself as did other boxers and sports writers, and The Prizefighter and the Lady (1933), which starred heavyweight champion Max Baer (boxer).

Death
Near the time of his death, he was working as a "host" at Jim Flynn's Cafe in Los Angeles, a beer hall named after the heavyweight boxer. He had recently refereed a boxing match.

Papke died on November 27, 1936 by suicide, after first killing his wife. The violent incident may have been a result of undiagnosed brain dementia suffered from years of trauma in the ring.  It occurred at his wife Edna's residence on Balboa Island, part of Newport Beach, south of Los Angeles in Southern California.  Papke was disappointed about his wife's recent divorce and was hoping for a reconciliation.  Both he and his wife were buried at Mt. View Cemetery in Altadena, California, slightly North of Pasadena and Los Angeles. He left three sons with whom he lived, Robert, Clifford, and William A. Papke Jr.

He is a primary character in the novel, The Killings of Stanley Ketchel, (2005), by James Carlos Blake.

Professional boxing record
All information in this section is derived from BoxRec, unless otherwise stated.

Official record

All newspaper decisions are officially regarded as “no decision” bouts and are not counted to the win/loss/draw column.

Unofficial record

Record with the inclusion of newspaper decisions to the win/loss/draw column.

Primary boxing achievements and honors

See also
List of middleweight boxing champions

References

External links 
 
 International Boxing Hall of Fame site
 Photo & Stats.
 Firstchoicebooks publisher

Boxers from Illinois
Middleweight boxers
Murder–suicides in California
People from Spring Valley, Illinois
Suicides by firearm in California
1886 births
1936 suicides
American male boxers